The French cruiser Dupleix was the lead ship of her class of three armored cruisers built for the French Navy in the first decade of the 20th century. Designed for overseas service and armed with eight  guns, the ships were smaller and less powerfully armed than their predecessors. Completed in 1903, Dupleix was initially assigned to the Atlantic Division as its flagship. 
The ship spent 1906 to 1909 in reserve before she was sent to the Far East in 1910, again serving as a flagship.

When World War I began in August 1914, the cruiser was still in the Far East. Before she was transferred to the Eastern Mediterranean in May 1915, Dupleix spent most of her time on escort duty in the Indian Ocean and Red Sea. Over the next year, she was tasked to blockade the Aegean coast of Ottoman Turkey. To help protect Allied shipping from German commerce raiders, the ship was transferred to French West Africa in mid-1916 and remained there until October 1917 when she returned to France to be placed in reserve. Dupleix was decommissioned in 1919 and was sold for scrap in 1922.

Design and description
The Dupleix-class ships were much smaller and more lightly armed than the preceding . The cruisers displaced  as designed. They normally had a crew of 19 officers and 550 enlisted men, but accommodated 24 officers and 583 enlisted men when serving as a flagship.

The sister ships' propulsion machinery consisted of three vertical triple-expansion steam engines, each driving a single propeller shaft, using steam provided by water-tube boilers, but the types of machinery differed between them.

Armament and protection
The ships of the Dupleix class had a main armament that consisted of eight quick-firing (QF) Canon de 164.7 mm Modèle 1893–1896 guns. They were mounted in four twin gun turrets, one each fore and aft of the superstructure and a pair of wing turrets amidships. The cruisers' secondary armament consisted of four QF Canon de  Modèle de 1893 guns on single mounts in unprotected casemates in the hull. For defense against torpedo boats, they carried ten  and four  Hotchkiss guns, all of which were on single mounts. The ship were also equipped with two above-water  torpedo tubes, one on each broadside.

The face and sides of the gun turrets were protected by  Harvey face-hardened armor plates. The sides of the elliptical conning tower were 100 to 120 millimeters thick.

Construction and career
Dupleix, named after Joseph François Dupleix, the Governor-General of French India was ordered from the Arsenal de Rochefort on 18 December 1897. The ship was laid down on 18 January 1899, launched on 28 April 1900, and began her formal sea trials on 15 March 1903. During her preliminary trials in 1902 there was a boiler accident on 22 August in which seven stokers were badly burnt. One of the ship's high-pressure engine cylinders cracked during a 24-hour trial on 30 September; repairs and further testing delayed the ship's trials by eight months. Dupleix was finally commissioned on 15 September 1903. She cost 16,308,850 francs.

Upon completion the ship became flagship of the Atlantic Division, visiting the Azores, West Africa and the Americas before she was reduced to reserve in 1906. Four years later she was reactivated and assigned to the Far Eastern Division as its flagship. Departing Cherbourg, France, on 12 November 1910, she was based in Saigon, French Indochina, until August 1914. Her role as the division flagship was assumed by the armored cruiser  upon that ship's arrival in Saigon in 1913.

World War I
As tensions rose during the July Crisis of 1914, Dupleix departed Japan on 29 July and arrived in British Hong Kong on 5 August where she joined the British China Squadron in accordance with pre-war plans. The following day she joined the British pre-dreadnought battleship  as she steamed north to begin the blockade of the German-leased port of Tsingtao. She developed engine problems which prevented her from joining the search for the German light cruiser  once the Imperial Japanese Navy assumed responsibility for the blockade on 9 September. Later that month, Dupleix was transferred to Penang in the British Straits Settlements to reinforce the French destroyers patrolling the Strait of Malacca and to have her engines repaired. By late September, the cruiser began escorting convoys through the Indian Ocean and the Red Sea, most notably the Wessex Territorials from Egypt to India in late October.

Dupleix was transferred to the newly formed Dardanelles Squadron in May 1915, which was tasked to blockade the Aegean coast of Turkey. On the 26th, the cruiser was attacked by Ottoman coastal artillery at Bodrum while inspecting shipping, losing 27 men killed and 11 wounded. The successes of German merchant raiders like  in 1916 caused the Allies to transfer cruisers to the Atlantic to protect their shipping. Dupleix was assigned to a newly-formed 6th Light Division ( (DL)), which consisted of all three sisters, in July 1916 and was based in Dakar, French West Africa.

The division was disbanded on 14 September and the cruiser sailed to Brest, to be placed in reserve on 15 October. She was decommissioned on 1 May 1919 and stricken on 27 September from the Navy List. In 1920 Dupleix was towed to Landévennec and she was sold for scrap in 1922.

Notes

References 
 
 

 

Dupleix-class cruisers
Ships built in France
1900 ships
World War I cruisers of France